Soorya Gopi is an Indian litterateur,  short story writer, and sociologist. Soorya is the recipient of Kendra Sahitya Akademi Yuva Award 2016. She was born on 26 August 1987 at Kollam, Kerala, India to poet P. K. Gopi and Komalam.

Early life and education
She was educated at the Presentation High School and Basel Evangelical Mission Higher Secondary School, both of which are in Kozhikode. She has a bachelor's degree in Sociology and Malayalam and a master's degree in Sociology from Zamorin's Guruvayurappan College, ranking first in University of Calicut in both cases. She has acquired a Doctoral degree in Sociology from Mahatma Gandhi University, Kottayam.

Career 
Soorya Gopi has worked as a lecturer in the Department of Sociology at Sacred Hearts College, Thevara, Kochi. Currently she works as an Assistant Professor in Sociology at Sreenarayana Guru Open University situated in Kollam, Kerala. WWK reviews her story as :The story “Chirakulla Changalakal” (“Chains with Wings”)  is included here. The content of this story are the thoughts in loneliness of a girl who was sold. The author presents very beautifully in simple and effortless style, how a girl who was sold by her own parents as a housemaid sits in a sort of solitary confinement and views the outerworld with a wounded heart writing in intense pain and sorrow. The story ends where the girl escapes from the man who bought her and disappears in the crowded city. The symbols and metaphors that flash through the story and noteworthy. At the very outset of the story, there is an indication of a dead, rotten and stinking donkey and this is followed by the story of a few lives imprisoned in an inevitable tragedy.

Bibliography
Pookkale Snehicha Penkutti (2006)
Uppumazhayile Pachilakal (2012)
Pranayamathryum (2016)
KamukiKkaduva'' (2020)

Awards
 Kendra Sahitya Akademi Yuva Award
 Ankanam E. P. Sushama endowment award for best short story (2013)
 Madhyamam-Velicham award best short story (2009)
 Ankanam - Geetha Hiranyan Best Short Story award (2008) 
 Muttathu Varkey Kalaalaya Sahitya award for best short story (2008)
 State Bank of India-SBT award for the book Pookkale Snehicha Penkutti'' (2006)
 Malayala Manorama  best short story award (2006)
 Poorna Uroob  award for best short story (2005)

Personal life
Soorya married P.K. Sujith in 2012. They have a daughter named Chilanka.

References

1987 births
Living people
Women writers from Kerala
Writers from Kollam
Malayalam-language writers
21st-century Indian short story writers
Indian women short story writers
21st-century Indian women writers
Recipients of the Sahitya Akademi Yuva Puraskar